A list of films produced in France in 1939:

See also
 1939 in France

References

External links
 French films of 1939 at the Internet Movie Database
French films of 1939 at Cinema-francais.fr

1939
Films
French